WGOD-FM (97.9 FM) is a radio station licensed to serve Charlotte Amalie, U.S. Virgin Islands. The station is owned by North Caribbean Conference of SDA Broadcasting Corporation. The station is simulcast on WIGT (1690 AM), serving as a repeater of WGOD-FM. WIGT is owned by Three Angels Corporation.

WGOD-FM and WIGT air a religious radio format featuring a mix of teaching programs and Christian music. The station receives the majority of its programming as part of the Three Angels Broadcasting Network.

WGOD-FM operated under the call letters WIBS from its initial licensing in 1979 until August 13, 1985, when it became WGOD. It added an -FM suffix to the call sign on October 5, 1989, becoming WGOD-FM, so that the WGOD call letters could be assigned to a co-owned AM station.

WIGT originated as the expanded band "twin" of an existing station on the standard AM band. On March 17, 1997 the Federal Communications Commission (FCC) announced that 88 stations had been given permission to move to newly available "Expanded Band" transmitting frequencies, ranging from 1610 to 1700 kHz, with WGOD authorized to move from 1090 to 1690 kHz.

An application for the expanded band station was filed on June 16, 1997. The initial authorization specified that it would be for the standard U.S. "Model I" transmitter powers of 10,000 watts during the day and 1,000 watts at night. However, France filed an objection, on the grounds that under an international agreement this resulted in impermissibly strong  signals at its territories of Martinique and Guadeloupe, and the original Construction Permit (CP) was rescinded in 2000.

In 2006 a modified application was filed, specifying a power of 920 watts both day and night, and the resulting CP was assigned the call letters WIGT on August 12, 2010. The FCC's initial policy was that both the original station and its expanded band counterpart could operate simultaneously for up to five years, after which owners would have to turn in one of the two licenses, depending on whether they preferred the new assignment or elected to remain on the original frequency. This deadline was extended multiple times, and both stations remained authorized beyond the initial cut-off date. (The original station on 1090 AM, now holding the call letters WUVI, was eventually deleted, on September 23, 2019.)

In 2017, damage from Hurricane Irma silenced WIGT beginning on September 7. A Special Temporary Authority (STA) grant, renewed on June 18, 2018, was issued allowing the station to remain off the air while repairs were being made. WIGT resumed broadcasting on September 5, 2018, at a reduced power of 400 watts. The station was issued a series of STAs on September 7, 2018, March 19, 2019, September 23, 2019, April 14, 2020, November 3, 2020 and May 25, 2021, allowing it to continue operating with 400 watts while arrangements were being made to install a replacement 1,000-watt transmitter that would allow it to resume operations at its licensed power of 920 watts.

In 2020 it was announced that WGOD-FM was being acquired from Three Angels by the North Caribbean Conference of SDA [Seventh-Day Adventist] Broadcasting Corporation, with Three Angels retaining ownership of WIGT.

References

External links
 WGOD-FM official website
 

GOD-FM
Radio stations established in 1979
Three Angels Broadcasting Network radio stations
1979 establishments in the United States Virgin Islands
Charlotte Amalie, U.S. Virgin Islands